Sue Bea Montgomery (born 1958) is an American film producer from Tulsa, Oklahoma.
After serving as an associate producer on the 1999 Independent film Chillicothe, she introduced the film's director Todd Edwards and his brother Cory Edwards to entrepreneur and inventor Maurice Kanbar, who had invested in the film. Kanbar agreed to finance the brothers to direct a computer animated film, based on a well known fairy tale, and they came up with Hoodwinked, a unique retelling of Little Red Riding Hood.
To produce the film, Montgomery and Kanbar founded Kanbar Entertainment and Kanbar Animation in 2002.
To save costs, the film's animation was produced in Manila, Philippines, which made it the first independent computer animated film to be produced in the Philippines.
The film was also one of the first computer animated films to be completely independently funded.
Hoodwinked! was released in 2005, receiving mixed reviews, and earning over $110 million worldwide.
Montgomery served as a producer on two PBS Kids series; Sid the Science Kid from 2008 to 2009 and Dinosaur Train from 2009 to 2010. She was nominated for a Daytime Emmy award in the category of Outstanding Children's Animated Program for her work on Dinosaur Train.
She has also worked on a number of other well known films, including Ironweed, The Shawshank Redemption, Air Force One, and Atlantis: The Lost Empire.

Filmography

References

External links 

1958 births
Living people
American film producers
American women film producers
American animated film producers
21st-century American women